Timo Benitz (born 24 December 1991 in Engen) is a German middle-distance runner competing primarily in the 1500 metres. He took a surprise victory in the 800 metres at the 2014 European Team Championships in Braunschweig where in front of home crowd he beat among others Adam Kszczot and Pierre-Ambroise Bosse. In 2017 he competed at the World Championships reaching the semifinals and later won the gold medal at the 2017 Summer Universiade.

International competitions

Personal bests
Outdoor
800 metres – 1:46.24 (Braunschweig 2014)
1000 metres – 2:16.90 (Pliezhausen 2014)
1500 metres – 3:34.94 (Dessau 2014)

Indoor
3000 metres – 8:02.62 (Leipzig 2014)

References

1991 births
Living people
People from Engen
Sportspeople from Freiburg (region)
German male middle-distance runners
World Athletics Championships athletes for Germany
Universiade medalists in athletics (track and field)
Universiade gold medalists for Germany
Medalists at the 2017 Summer Universiade